Salvia longispicata is a perennial shrub native to southwestern Mexico, growing between  elevation. The specific epithet "longispicata" gives the impression that the plant has "long spikes", but instead refers to the many projecting clusters of short flowering spikes that resemble small ears of corn.

While not particularly showy, it has unusual dark purple flowers and an upright habit—both qualities are valued by salvia hybridizers. The mid-green ovate leaves are many sizes, and connected to the petiole at the broader end. Small - less than  - dark purple flowers begin appearing in summer and bloom into late autumn. The pale green calyces are about the same length as the flower. The  inflorescences have tight whorls of flowers, which do not rise above the foliage as many other species of Salvia do.

In 1979 a spontaneous sterile hybrid was found at Huntington Botanical Garden that was believed to be from a cross between Salvia longispicata and S. farinacea. It was introduced as the highly popular Salvia farinacea × longispicata 'Indigo Spires'. Other cultivars of this hybrid include 'Mystic Spires Blue'.

References

longispicata
Plants described in 1844
Flora of Mexico